Spiranthes infernalis, common name Ash Meadows lady's tresses, is a rare species of orchid known from only four locations in Nevada, all close to one another. The type locale is inside Ash Meadows National Wildlife Refuge, in Nye County approximately  WNW of Las Vegas. The site is a seasonally wet meadow.

The epithet infernalis means "of the underworld" or "of the nether regions", in reference to the extremely hot climate of the region.

Description
Spiranthes infernalis is a terrestrial herb up to 40 cm (16 inches) tall. It has tuberous roots. Leaves are lanceolate, up to 15 cm (6 inches) long. The flowers are yellowish-white with an orange lip, borne in a tightly spiralled spike.

References

Flora of Nevada
infernalis
Endemic orchids of the United States